1849 in archaeology

Explorations
U.S. Army Lt. James H. Simpson leads the Washington Expedition, a military reconnaissance team which surveys Navajo lands and records cultural sites in Chaco Canyon. Illustrations created by the Kern brothers are included in a government report.
U.S. Navy Capt. William F. Lynch identifies Tell el Kadi as the site of the ancient city of Dan.
Site of Uruk discovered by William Loftus.

Excavations
Tunnel dug into Silbury Hill.

Publications
 Austen H. Layard's Illustrations of the Monuments of Nineveh.
 Karl Richard Lepsius' Denkmaeler aus Aegypten und Aethiopien.

Finds
 Find on Whaddon Chase, Buckinghamshire, England of a hoard of Iron Age gold staters.

Births
 November 8 — Maxime Collignon, French archaeologist (d. 1917)
 December 5 — Eduard Seler, German Mesoamericanist (d. 1922)

Deaths

See also
 List of years in archaeology
 1848 in archaeology
 1850 in archaeology

References

1849 archaeological discoveries
Archaeology by year
Archaeology